Bruno Cesar Xavier Sislo (born 27 November 1996), known as Bruno Xavier, is a Brazilian professional footballer who plays as an attacking midfielder for Mirassol.

Club career
Born in São Paulo, Bruno Xavier was a Portuguesa youth graduate. He made his senior debut on 8 June 2015, coming on as a late substitute for goalscorer Guilherme Queiróz in a 3–0 away win against Guaratinguetá for the Série C championship.

Definitely promoted to the main squad in June 2016, Bruno Xavier scored his first senior goal on 9 July of that year, netting the opener in a 2–1 away loss against the same opponent. On 9 July 2017, he terminated his contract with Lusa, and joined Nacional-SP late in the month.

On 23 August 2017, after scoring five goals in only six matches for Naça in the Copa Paulista, Bruno Xavier joined Série A side Sport initially on a trial basis. He subsequently signed a loan contract until the end of the year, and made his debut in the category on 10 September by replacing Samuel Xavier in a 1–0 loss at Avaí.

On 14 December 2017, Bruno Xavier was released by Sport and subsequently returned to Nacional. The following 24 April, after being the club's top goalscorer in the Campeonato Paulista Série A2, he signed a loan deal with Corinthians until May 2019.

Career statistics

References

External links

1996 births
Living people
Footballers from São Paulo
Brazilian footballers
Brazilian expatriate footballers
Association football midfielders
Campeonato Brasileiro Série B players
Campeonato Brasileiro Série C players
Primeira Liga players
Associação Portuguesa de Desportos players
Nacional Atlético Clube (SP) players
Sport Club do Recife players
Sport Club Corinthians Paulista players
Guarani FC players
Oeste Futebol Clube players
C.D. Aves players
Esporte Clube Juventude players
Clube Atlético Juventus players
Paraná Clube players
Associação Atlética Internacional (Limeira) players
Mirassol Futebol Clube players
Expatriate footballers in Portugal
Brazilian expatriate sportspeople in Portugal